Amanieu II (after 1230 – 11 March 1318) was the Archbishop of Auch. Elected in 1261, he received consecration at Rome from Pope Urban IV in 1263.

Amanieu was the third son of Roger, viscount of Fezensaguet, and Pucelle d'Albret, and thus a descendant of the Counts of Armagnac and the Sires of Albret. Amanieu's eldest brother was Geraud VI of Armagnac. In 1278 Geraud and Amanieu signed a treaty sharing jurisdiction in Barran, where the bishop had his summer residence, between the Church and the County. The village was fortified as a bastide the next year (1279).

In 1268 Amanieu purchased the hospital of Pont d'Artigues from the Order of Santiago for the Order of the Faith and Peace, a military order founded by his predecessor to keep the peace in Gascony. He also appointed his nephew master of the order, but it did not stave off the order's decline, which had been apparent from the early 1260s. Pope Gregory X dissolved the order in 1273 and its possessions ended up largely in the hands of the Order of Santiago and the church of Auch, though Les Feuillants Abbey laid claim to some.

References

Kantorowicz, Ernst H. "Inalienability: A Note on Canonical Practice and the English Coronation Oath in the Thirteenth Century" Speculum, 29:3 (Jul., 1954), pp. 488–502.
Forey, Alan J. (1989). "The Military Orders and Holy War against Christians in the Thirteenth Century." The English Historical Review, 104:410 (Jan.), pp. 1–24.
Forey, Alan J. (1992). The Military Orders: From the Twelfth to the Early Fourteenth Centuries. Toronto: University of Toronto Press. .
Linehan, P. A. and Zutshi, P. N. A. "Fiat A: the Earliest Known Roll of Petitions Signed by the Pope (1307)." The English Historical Review, 122:498 (2007), pp. 998–1015.

External links

 cites Gascony, Chapter 3: Comtes d'Armagnac, Part B. 
Barran at Villages of the Gers, see "Heritage and history"

13th-century births
1318 deaths
Archbishops of Auch
Year of birth uncertain